The Mountain may refer to:

Places 
 "The Mountain", nickname of the Mount Panorama Circuit, an auto racing circuit in Bathurst, New South Wales, Australia
 Mount Royal (la montagne/"the mountain"), a hill totally surrounded by the city of Montreal, Canada
 "The Mountain", nickname for the portion of the Niagara Escarpment within the city of Hamilton, Ontario, Canada
 Mount Rainier, often known simply as "the mountain" throughout Washington State, USA
 "The Mountain", a section of British motor racing circuit Cadwell Park, named for its steep gradient
 “The Mountain”, the nickname of Falun Gong's Dragon Springs compound

Arts and entertainment

Artworks 
The Mountain (Maillol), or La Montagne, a monumental sculpture by Aristide Maillol
The Mountain, a post-modern artwork by Balthus

Films
 The Mountain (1956 film), starring Spencer Tracy and Robert Wagner
 The Mountain (1991 film), a Swiss film
 The Mountain (2012 film), a Turkish drama film
 The Mountain (2018 film), an American film

Music

Groups
 The Mountains (band), Danish musical band

Albums
 The Mountain (EP), a 1995 EP by Will Oldham
 The Mountain (Heartless Bastards album)
 The Mountain (Steve Earle album), a 1999 album by Steve Earle with the Del McCoury Band
 The Mountain (Haken album), a 2013 album by Haken
 The Mountain (Dierks Bentley album), a 2018 album by Dierks Bentley
 The Mountain, a 1989 album by Abdullah Ibrahim

Songs
 "The Mountain" (song), a 2018 song by Three Days Grace
 "The Mountain", a song by Mason Jennings from his 2000 album Birds Flying Away
"The Mountain", a song by Bob Seger from his 1991 album The Fire Inside
"The Mountain", a song by Derroll Adams from his 1994 album Songs Of The Banjoman
 "The Mountain", an instrumental by Trans-Siberian Orchestra from their 2009 album Night Castle
 "The Mountain", a composition by Abdullah Ibrahim

Other uses
 The Mountain (TV series), broadcast on the WB Television Network
 "The Mountain", the nickname for Ser Gregor Clegane in the George R.R. Martin book series A Song of Ice and Fire, and its HBO television serialization Game of Thrones

Radio stations
Entercom Communications radio stations:
 KHTP (103.7 FM), an adult alternative station in the Seattle metro area
 KQMT (99.5 FM), a classic rock station in the Denver area
 WKRZ-HD2 (98.5 HD2), old and new Adult Rock in Northeastern Pennsylvania
 WCQS (88.1 FM), an NPR station out of Asheville, North Carolina

Political groups
 The Mountain, a political group during the French Revolution
 The Mountain (1849), a later French political group of the Second Republic

People
 Hafþór Júlíus Björnsson, nicknamed "The Mountain", Icelandic strongman and actor

See also
 MountainWest Sports Network, a now-defunct TV channel of the Mountain West Conference, informally known as the mtn. but pronounced "the mountain"
 Mountain (disambiguation)
 The Mount (disambiguation)
 The Hill (disambiguation)